Dentocorticium sulphurellum is a species of crust fungus in the family Polyporaceae. It is characterized by its toothed surface, its sulphur-yellow colour, and microscopically by the presence of dendrohyphidia in the hymenium. Charles Horton Peck originally described it in 1879 as Hydnum sulphurellum; it was transferred to Dentocorticium in 1974. It is found in North America and Japan.

References

Fungi described in 1879
Fungi of Japan
Fungi of North America
Polyporaceae
Taxa named by Charles Horton Peck